Rhaecelus or Rhaikelos was an Eretrian colony in Lower Macedonia, near Aeneia, founded by Athenian tyrant Peisistratos of the 6th century BC. Its site is located near Aeneia.

References

Cities in ancient Macedonia
Populated places in ancient Macedonia
Eretrian colonies
Greek colonies in Chalcidice
Former populated places in Greece